Torre-serona is a village in the province of Lleida and autonomous community of Catalonia, Spain.

Toponymy 
From the spanish torre, the tower and the Pyrenean Celt  Serona, goddess Sirona.

References

External links
 Government data pages 

Municipalities in Segrià